Kavala is a seaport city in northern Greece

Kavala may also refer to:

Kavala (regional unit), a regional unit of Greece that is part of East Macedonia and Thrace
Kavala B.C., a basketball club based in the Greek city
Kavala F.C., an association football club based in the Greek city
Kavala Island, in Lake Tanganyika, Africa
Kavala Prefecture, a former prefecture of Greece, established in 1915 and disestablished in 2011
Osman Kavala (born 1957), Turkish businessman and philanthropist

See also
Cavalla (disambiguation)
Kabala (disambiguation)